Grupo Desportivo Santa Cruz de Alvarenga is a Portuguese association football club based in Arouca. It was founded in 1977, and currently competes in the Campeonato de Portugal, the fourth tier of Portuguese football.

Notable players
  Isidro Pitta (2017–2018)
  Sahil Tavora (2018–2019)

References

External links
Official Web Site 
CeroaCero Profile

Football clubs in Portugal
Association football clubs established in 1977
1977 establishments in Portugal